Kurmiškė (Varėna) is a village in Varėna district municipality, in Alytus County, in southeastern Lithuania. According to the 2001 census, the village has a population of 10 people.

References

Villages in Alytus County
Varėna District Municipality